The Sardo Modicana is a breed of beef cattle from the Italian island of Sardinia. It is one of the sixteen minor Italian cattle breeds of limited diffusion recognised and protected by the Ministero delle Politiche Agricole Alimentari e Forestali, the Italian ministry of agriculture.

References

Cattle breeds originating in Italy